Massimiliano Rosa (born 12 October 1970 in Venice) is a retired Italian professional footballer who played as a defender.

Honours
Juventus
 Coppa Italia winner: 1989–90.
 UEFA Cup winner: 1989–90 (he played in the 1990 UEFA Cup Final even though he did not play any Serie A games until the 1994–95 season).

External links
 Career summary by playerhistory.com 

1970 births
Living people
Italian footballers
Serie A players
Serie B players
Venezia F.C. players
Juventus F.C. players
Cagliari Calcio players
Calcio Padova players
U.S. Salernitana 1919 players
S.P.A.L. players
UEFA Cup winning players
Association football defenders